This is a list of notable Acehnese people.

Academics
 Dina Astita, tsunami survivor
 Teuku Jacob, paleoanthropologist

Athletes
 Ismed Sofyan, football athlete
 Jalwandi, football
 Teuku Ichsan

Businesspeople
 Surya Paloh, owner of Metro TV

Entertainment
 P. Ramlee, Malaysian film director
 Qory Sandioriva, Puteri Indonesia 2010, Miss Universe Indonesia 2010, film actress, model
 Teuku Wisnu, soap opera actor

Islamic scholars
 Hamzah Fansuri
 Nuruddin ar-Raniri

Sultanates
 Alauddin al Qahhar, a sultan of Aceh Sultanate
 Ali Mughayat Syah, a sultan of Aceh Sultanate
 Iskandar Muda, a sultan of Aceh Sultanate
 Iskandar Thani, a sultan of Aceh Sultanate
 Ratu Zainatuddin of Aceh, a sultana of Aceh Sultanate
 Salahuddin of Aceh, a sultan of Aceh Sultanate
 Ratu Safiatuddin Taj ul-Alam, a sultana of Aceh Sultanate

Military
 Daud Bereueh, military Governor of Aceh
 Hasan di Tiro, founder of the Free Aceh Movement

National heroes
 Cut Nyak Dhien
 Cut Nyak Meutia
 Teuku Umar
 Teuku Muhammad Hasan

Politicians
 Abdoe'lxarim M. S. (1901–60) former Communist Party notable and Boven-Digoel internee
 Azwar Abubakar, former governor of Aceh, former Minister for Administrative Reform
 Hasballah M. Saad, former Minister of Law and Human Rights
 Irwandi Yusuf, former governor of Aceh (2007–2012)
 Jusman Syafii Djamal, former Minister of Transportation
 Muhammad Nazar, former vice governor of Aceh (2007–2012)
 Mustafa Abubakar, former acting governor of Aceh (2006), former state minister of state enterprises
 Tengku Adnan Tengku Mansor, current Malaysian Minister of the Federal Territories and former minister of Tourism (2006–2008)
 Zaini Abdullah, current governor of Aceh

See also
 Acehnese people
 List of Batak people
 List of Bugis people
 List of Chinese Indonesians
 List of Javanese people
 List of Minangkabaus
 List of Moluccan people
 List of Sundanese people

 
Acehnese
Acehnese